Karl Benrath (10 August 1845 in Düren – 21 July 1924 in Königsberg) was a German church historian.

Benrath was educated in Bonn, Berlin and Heidelberg. In 1871 went on a scientific tour of several years to Italy and England. From 1879 he was professor at Bonn, and from 1890 professor of church history at Königsberg.

His most important works describe 16th century reformation movement in Northern Italy.

Sources
 Mennonite Encyclopedia, Vol. 1, p. 274.

1845 births
1924 deaths
19th-century German historians
German male non-fiction writers
19th-century German male writers
19th-century German writers
20th-century German historians
20th-century German male writers
People from Düren
Historians of Christianity